Tailboys or Talboys was the name of a prominent gentry family from Lincolnshire, England.

People of this surname include:
Ivo Taillebois (d. 1094), Norman landholder in Lincolnshire and sheriff
Brian Talboys (1921–2012), New Zealand politician
Elizabeth Blount (d. 1539/40), also known as Bessie Blount, who became Baroness Tailboys on her marriage
Elizabeth Tailboys, 4th Baroness Tailboys of Kyme (c.1520–1563)
George Tailboys, 2nd Baron Tailboys of Kyme (c.1523–1540)
Gilbert Tailboys (c.1497/8–1530), 1st Baron Tailboys of Kyme, husband of Elizabeth Blount
Graeme K. Talboys (b. 1953), English writer
Keith Talboys (b. 1931), English cricketer
Robert Tailboys, 3rd Baron Tailboys of Kyme (c.1528–1542)
Steve Talboys (1966–2019), English footballer
Sir William Tailboys (c.1415–1464), 7th Baron Tailboys of Kyme, Lincolnshire squire

Other uses 
 "Talboys", the fictional country home of Lord Peter Wimsey and his wife Harriet

See also
Tallboy (disambiguation)